Santa Cruz is a civil parish contained in the municipality of Almodôvar, Portugal. The population in 2011 was 651, in an area of 123.38 km2.

References

Freguesias of Almodôvar